Fatma Sultan ( 1559 – October 1580; , "One who abstains") was an Ottoman princess, daughter of Sultan Selim II (reign 1566–74) of the Ottoman Empire and his favorite Nurbanu Sultan (but her maternity is disputed). She was the granddaughter of Suleiman the Magnificent (reign 1520–66) and Hurrem Sultan, sister of Sultan Murad III (reign 1574–95) and aunt of Sultan Mehmed III (reign 1595–1603).

Early life
Fatma was born circa 1559 during Selim's princedom, at Konya or Karaman where he served as sanjakbey, or provincial governor, at the time. She was her father's youngest daughter. Her mother's identity is uncertain; it is suggested that she was the fourth daughter of Nurbanu Sultan, however the claim remains disputed. She had three older sisters, Şah Sultan, Gevherhan Sultan and Ismihan Sultan, an older brother, Murad III, and six younger half-brothers who died infants when Murad became Sultan and he applicated the Law of Fraticide.

Marriage
In 1573, she married Kanijeli Siyavuş Pasha (died 1602), then Beylerbey (governor-general) of Rumelia, and eventually Grand Vizier 1582–1584, 1586–1589, 1592–1593. Stephan Gerlach, first assistant and clergyman to the ambassador of the Holy Roman Empire at Istanbul from 1573 to 1578, recorded word that the Beylerbey was originally a slave whom Fatma's father Selim bought as a boy for 500 ducats and came to regard as his own son. It was in Sultan Selim's will that this marriage be arranged.

Fatma's dowry amounted to approximately 5000 ducats. The marriage was happy, as indicated by the fact that she pleaded with her brother Murad to spare Siyavuş Pasha's life when at some point the latter fell out of favour. Siyavuş Pasha's physician, Moses Benveniste was often at dinner with the couple. She bore her husband four sons and a stillbirth daughter.

Charities
Fatma had an elementary school, or mektep, as well as a religious college, or medrese, constructed at Edirnekapı.

Death
Fatma Sultan died in October 1580, at Istanbul, in childbirth as a result of her daughter being born prematurely. The latter reportedly died too. She was entombed in her father Sultan Selim II's mausoleum in Hagia Sophia Mosque. She had a provision made, supported by vakfs, that is,  charitable foundations, so that the Quran would be read every morning, for the sake of her soul.

Issue
By her marriage, Fatma had four sons and a daughter. Only a son survived after infancy. 
Sultanzade Ahmed Bey (1573 - 1582)
Sultanzade Mustafa Paşah (1575 - April 1599)
Sultanzade Abdulkaadir Bey (1577 - 1583)
Sultanzade Süleyman Bey (1579 - 1583)
Fülane Hanımsultan (October 1580 - October 1580). Stillbirth. Fatma died in childbirth.

References

Sources
 

 
 
 

People from Konya
Deaths in childbirth
1550s births
1580 deaths
16th-century Ottoman princesses